Lasmigona alabamensis, common name Alabama heelsplitter, is a species of freshwater mussel, an aquatic bivalve mollusk in the family Unionidae.

Confusingly, a different species, Potamilus inflatus, has also sometimes been listed as "Alabama heelsplitter". In order to avoid confusion, that species has now been given the common name "inflated heelsplitter".

References

alabamensis
Molluscs described in 1985